The Perceptual Signal Processing Lab, or PSPLab, is an audio research lab of National Chiao Tung University. It is located in Hsinchu, Taiwan, and focuses on researching better perceptual signal processing techniques, particularly in regard to DSP, Perception, and Software.

Current areas of research in PSPLab include:

 Multi Channel Audio Compression
 MP3 codec, MPEG-2/4 AAC codec
 Psychoacoustic model, Bit Allocation, Filterbank
 Low-delay AAC codec
 Perceptual Evaluation of Audio Quality (PEAQ)
 MPEG Surround
 Multi Channel Audio Effect Processing
 Room Reverberation
 Room Acoustics
 Real-time DSP Programming/Optimization
 Variant Platform Optimization
 Fixed-Point DSP Programming

External links
 Perceptual Signal Processing Lab homepage

Sound